The Giant Viper was a trailer-mounted, vehicle-pulled, mine clearance system, designed to be deployed in areas containing land mines. It was developed for the British Army in the 1950s. It was designed to be towed behind a Centurion gun tank, FV4003, AVRE (Armoured Vehicle Royal Engineers); and also the FV432 Armoured personnel carrier.

The Giant Viper used rockets to launch a 250-metre-long hose, packed with plastic explosive, across a minefield. In the 1970s, the Giant Viper hoses were filled at ROF Chorley. Once it lands the charge is detonated, clearing a six-metre-wide path of anti-personnel and anti-tank mines by sympathetic detonation. This cleared path has a length of around 200 metres. For safety, a vehicle fitted with a mine plough is driven through the cleared path before any other personnel, in order to push any undetonated mines safely out of the way.

This system has been superseded by the Python, employing the same clearance methodology, but using more modern components. It improves accuracy of delivery, deployment speed, and the size of the cleared path, which is now 230 metres long and 7 meters wide. Python was designed to be towed behind an AVRE.

The Hellenic Army's Engineer Corps still utilize the system.

See also
 Mine-clearing line charge

Notes

References
 
 

Military engineering vehicles of the United Kingdom
Mine warfare countermeasures
Military equipment introduced in the 1950s